Belarusian Front may refer to several Soviet fronts of the Second World War:
 Belorussian Front (1939), formed during the Soviet invasion of Poland (1939)
1st Belorussian Front, formed in 1943 and active in the Vistula–Oder Offensive and the Battle of Berlin
2nd Belorussian Front, formed in 1944 and active in the East Prussian Offensive and the Battle of Berlin
3rd Belorussian Front, formed in 1944 and active in Operation Bagration and the East Prussian Offensive

Soviet fronts